Gensac-sur-Garonne (literally Gensac on Garonne) is a commune in the Haute-Garonne department in southwestern France.

Geography
The commune is bordered by five other communes: Saint-Julien-sur-Garonne across the river Garonne to the north, Rieux-Volvestre to the northeast, Goutevernisse to the east, Saint-Christaud to the south, and finally by Cazères across the river Garonne to the west.

The river Garonne flows through the commune, making the suffix -sur-Garonne, forming a border between Saint-Julien-sur-Garonne and Cazères.

Population

See also
Communes of the Haute-Garonne department

References

Communes of Haute-Garonne